Worcester College, Oxford is one of the constituent colleges of the University of Oxford in England.

Worcester College may also refer to:

England
New College Worcester, formerly Worcester College for the Blind
University of Worcester, formerly University College Worcester and before that Worcester College of Higher Education
Worcester College of Technology
Worcester Sixth Form College

United States
Worcester Polytechnic Institute
Worcester State University

See also
College of Wooster, Ohio, United States
Worcester (disambiguation)